Hapa-palooza is an annual cultural arts festival held in Vancouver, British Columbia, Canada.

History
Conceived at the 2010 Gung Haggis Fat Choy dinner in Vancouver, BC, Hapa-palooza was co-founded by author, Anna Ling Kaye, filmmaker, Jeff Chiba Stearns and promoter, Zarah Martz in 2011. The inaugural festival ran from September 7 to 10, 2011. Hapa-palooza, run by the Hybrid Ancestry Public Arts Society, is the first mixed roots festival in Canada and is currently one of the largest festivals celebrating mixed heritage in the world.

Awards
On Sunday, June 4, 2017, Hapa-palooza was presented the exploreASIAN Community Recognition Award at the Vancouver Asian Heritage Month Society's honourASIAN Gala, held at the Museum of Vancouver.

References

Festivals in Vancouver